Néstor A. Alonso Vega (born June 26, 1985) is a Puerto Rican politician. He was elected to the Puerto Rico House of Representatives on the 2016 general election. Alonso was arrested by the FBI in November 2020 on 9 charges of corruption for numerous crimes, which include theft and money laundering, perpetrated specifically through a kickback scheme. Alonso resigned from his position on November 10, 2020.

References 

1985 births
Interamerican University of Puerto Rico alumni
Living people
New Progressive Party members of the House of Representatives of Puerto Rico
University of Puerto Rico alumni
21st-century American politicians